Risto Arnaudovski (born 9 July 1981) is a retired Macedonian handball player.

References

1981 births
Living people
Macedonian male handball players
Croatian male handball players
RK Zagreb players
Handball players from Zagreb
Croatian people of Macedonian descent
Croatian emigrants to North Macedonia
Expatriate handball players
Handball-Bundesliga players